Eric Augustus "Sleepy" Floyd (born March 6, 1960) is an American former professional basketball player. An NBA All-Star in 1987 as a Warrior, he is perhaps best known for his tenures for Golden State and Houston.

Early life, family and education
Floyd was born in Gastonia, North Carolina. He received the nickname "Sleepy" playing baseball in the fourth grade, when a spectator yelled "Get that kid out of the game. He’s sleeping."

A  guard, Floyd played competitively at Hunter Huss High School in Gastonia.  During Floyd's junior season at Hunter Huss High, he led his team to win in the 1977 North Carolina state basketball championship over rival Ashbrook High, a team led by James Worthy.

Collegiate career
Floyd was a star basketball player at Georgetown University (and was later inducted into the Georgetown University Athletic Hall of Fame). At Georgetown, Floyd excelled all four seasons, leading the team in scoring in 1979, 1980, 1981, 1982 and was team captain in 1981 and 1982. Floyd was named an All-Big East Conference selection in 1980, 1981, 1982, and an All-American in 1981 and 1982. In his final season at Georgetown, Floyd and co-star Patrick Ewing helped lead the Hoyas all the way to the National Championship game, where Floyd scored 18 points, recorded 5 assists, and stole the ball 5 times in a 63-62 loss to North Carolina. Floyd holds the Georgetown Hoyas men's basketball record for career points — 2,304.

Professional career
Floyd was drafted by the New Jersey Nets with the 13th pick of the 1982 NBA draft. During the middle of an unspectacular rookie season, Floyd was traded by the Nets with Mickey Johnson to the Golden State Warriors for Micheal Ray Richardson.  Floyd quickly blossomed while playing for the Warriors, averaging 16.8 points per game in his first full season with the franchise, and during the 1984–85 NBA season, he averaged a career high 19.5 points per game. Two seasons later, he averaged 18.8 points and 10.3 assists and earned a spot on the 1987 NBA All-Star Team. That season, on December 6, Floyd scored a career high 41 points in 109-104 loss against the Dallas Mavericks. During the 1987 NBA Playoffs, Floyd averaged 21.4 points, 10.2 assists, and 1.8 steals in 10 games, and played a key role in a first round upset of the Karl Malone-led Utah Jazz. The following round, however, the Warriors were eliminated by the eventual champion Los Angeles Lakers.

In December 1987, Floyd was traded with Joe Barry Carroll to the Houston Rockets for Ralph Sampson and Steve Harris. On February 26, 1991, Floyd scored 40 points after playing only 24 minutes (the fewest minutes needed for a 40 point game in NBA history), in a 129-99 win over the Denver Nuggets. Floyd would play 5½ seasons in total with the Rockets before signing as a free agent with the San Antonio Spurs in 1993, a year before the Rockets would win their two consecutive championships. After one season in San Antonio, he returned to the New Jersey Nets, and he retired in 1995 with 12,260 career points and 5,175 career assists.

Floyd still holds the NBA playoff record for points scored in a quarter (29) and in half (39), in Game 4 of the aforementioned 1987 Western Conference Semifinals against the Lakers. Floyd scored 12 consecutive field goals in the fourth quarter, finishing the game with 51 points, and prevented a sweep of the Warriors by in-state rival Lakers.

Post career
After retiring from the NBA, Floyd ran a restaurant for three years, and he started a financial management company. In 2004–2005, he coached junior varsity boys' basketball at Gaston Day School, located in Gastonia, North Carolina, his hometown.

Floyd accompanied a group of basketball players to North Korea in January 2014 for an exhibition game honoring that nation's leader Kim Jong Un as "basketball diplomacy". Less than a half day after his arrival, Floyd regretted the trip, feeling "misled".

NBA career statistics

Regular season 

|-
| style="text-align:left;"| 
| style="text-align:left;"|New Jersey
| 43 || 6 || 11.5 || .426 || .286 || .844 || 1.0 || 1.6 || 0.4 || 0.2 || 5.3
|-
| style="text-align:left;"| 
| style="text-align:left;"|Golden State
| 33 || 11 || 22.8 || .431 || .545 || .830 || 2.9 || 2.2 || 1.2 || 0.2 || 11.7
|-
| style="text-align:left;"| 
| style="text-align:left;"|Golden State
| 77 || 73 || 33.2 || .463 || .178 || .816 || 3.5 || 3.5 || 1.3 || 0.4 || 16.8
|-
| style="text-align:left;"| 
| style="text-align:left;"|Golden State
| 82 || 82 || 35.0 || .445 || .294 || .810 || 2.5 || 5.0 || 1.6 || 0.5 || 19.5
|-
| style="text-align:left;"| 
| style="text-align:left;"|Golden State
| 82 || 82 || 33.7 || .506 || .328 || .796 || 3.6 || 9.1 || 1.9 || 0.2 || 17.2
|-
| style="text-align:left;"| 
| style="text-align:left;"|Golden State
| 82 || 82 || 37.4 || .488 || .384 || .860 || 3.3 || 10.3 || 1.8 || 0.2 || 18.8
|-
| style="text-align:left;"| 
| style="text-align:left;"|Golden State
| 18 || 18 || 37.8 || .439 || .050 || .835 || 5.1 || 9.9 || 1.5 || 0.1 || 21.2
|-
| style="text-align:left;"| 
| style="text-align:left;"|Houston
| 59 || 55 || 31.1 || .431 || .250 || .860 || 3.5 || 6.2 || 1.2 || 0.2 || 13.1
|-
| style="text-align:left;"| 
| style="text-align:left;"|Houston
| 82 || 82 || 34.0 || .443 || .373 || .845 || 3.7 || 8.6 || 1.5 || 0.1 || 14.2
|-
| style="text-align:left;"| 
| style="text-align:left;"|Houston
| 82 || 73 || 32.1 || .451 || .380 || .806 || 2.4 || 7.3 || 1.1 || 0.1 || 12.2
|-
| style="text-align:left;"| 
| style="text-align:left;"|Houston
| 82 || 4 || 22.6 || .411 || .273 || .752 || 1.9 || 3.9 || 1.2 || 0.2 || 12.3
|-
| style="text-align:left;"| 
| style="text-align:left;"|Houston
| 82 || 3 || 20.3 || .406 || .301 || .794 || 1.8 || 2.9 || 0.7 || 0.3 || 9.1
|-
| style="text-align:left;"| 
| style="text-align:left;"|Houston
| 52 || 10 || 16.7 || .407 || .286 || .794 || 1.7 || 2.5 || 0.6 || 0.1 || 6.6
|-
| style="text-align:left;"| 
| style="text-align:left;"|San Antonio
| 53 || 2 || 13.9 || .335 || .222 || .667 || 1.3 || 1.9 || 0.2 || 0.2 || 3.8
|-
| style="text-align:left;"| 
| style="text-align:left;"|New Jersey
| 48 || 1 || 17.3 || .335 || .284 || .698 || 1.1 || 2.6 || 0.3 || 0.1 || 4.1
|- class="sortbottom"
| style="text-align:center;" colspan="2"| Career
| 957 || 584 || 27.6 || .444 || .324 || .815 || 2.6 || 5.4 || 1.2 || 0.2 || 12.8
|- class="sortbottom"
| style="text-align:center;" colspan="2"| All-Star
| 1 || 0 || 19.0 || .571 || .333 || .714 || 5.0 || 1.0 || 1.0 || 0.0 || 14.0

Playoffs 

|-
|style="text-align:left;"|1987
|style="text-align:left;”|Golden State
|10||10||41.4||.507||.464||.922||3.0||10.2||1.8||0.2||21.4
|-
|style="text-align:left;"|1988
|style="text-align:left;”|Houston
|4||4||38.5||.426||.500||.864||1.8||8.5||2.0||0.0||18.8
|-
|style="text-align:left;"|1989
|style="text-align:left;”|Houston
|4||4||40.0||.478||.533||.714||4.5||6.5||2.0||0.3||15.5
|-
|style="text-align:left;"|1990
|style="text-align:left;”|Houston
|4||4||43.0||.469||.250||.647||3.8||10.3||1.3||0.3||18.5
|-
|style="text-align:left;"|1991
|style="text-align:left;”|Houston
|3||0||13.7||.333||.000||–||0.7||2.3||0.7||0.3||5.3
|-
|style="text-align:left;"|1993
|style="text-align:left;”|Houston
|7||0||8.6||.316||.333||.700||0.6||1.1||0.3||0.0||2.9
|-
|style="text-align:left;"|1994
|style="text-align:left;”|San Antonio
|4||0||9.3||.250||–||.500||0.3||0.3||0.0||0.0||1.5
|- class="sortbottom"
| style="text-align:center;" colspan="2"| Career
| 36 || 22 || 28.8 || .457 || .414 || .814 || 2.1 || 6.1 || 1.2 || 0.1 || 13.0

See also
List of National Basketball Association players with 50 or more points in a playoff game

References

External links
Career stats

1960 births
Living people
African-American basketball players
All-American college men's basketball players
American men's basketball players
Basketball players from North Carolina
Georgetown Hoyas men's basketball players
Golden State Warriors players
Houston Rockets players
National Basketball Association All-Stars
New Jersey Nets draft picks
New Jersey Nets players
People from Gastonia, North Carolina
Point guards
San Antonio Spurs players
21st-century African-American people
20th-century African-American sportspeople